Muppanad  is a village near Meppadi in Wayanad district in the state of Kerala, India.

Demographics
 India census, Muppanad had a population of 22,935 with 11,344 males and 11,591 females.

Transportation
Muppanad is 82 km by road from Kozhikode railway station and this road includes nine hairpin bends. The nearest major airport is at Calicut. The road to the east connects to Mysore and Bangalore. Night journey is allowed on this sector as it goes through Bandipur national forest. The nearest railway station is Mysore.  There are airports at Bangalore and Calicut.

References

Villages in Wayanad district
Kalpetta area